Lima Barreto (23 June 1906 – 23 November 1982) was a Brazilian film director and screenwriter. He directed six films between 1940 and 1961. His film O Cangaceiro was entered into the 1953 Cannes Film Festival, where it was "much liked for its original and truly national flavour."

Filmography
 Fazenda Velha (1940)
 Painel (1951)
 Santuário (1952)
 O Cangaceiro (1953)
 São Paulo em Festa (1954)
 A Primeira Missa (1961)

References

External links

1906 births
1982 deaths
Brazilian film directors
Brazilian screenwriters
Brazilian film producers
Businesspeople from São Paulo
20th-century screenwriters